In video, a field is one of the many still images which are displayed sequentially to create the impression of motion on the screen.  Two fields comprise one video frame. When the fields are displayed on a video monitor they are "interlaced" so that the content of one field will be used on all of the odd-numbered lines on the screen and the other field will be displayed on the even lines.  Converting fields to a still frame image requires a process called deinterlacing, in which the missing lines are duplicated or interpolated to recreate the information that would have been contained in the discarded field. Since each field contains only half of the information of a full frame, however, deinterlaced images do not have the resolution of a full frame.

In order to increase the resolution of video images, therefore, new schemes have been created that capture full-frame images for each frame.  Video composed of such frames is called progressive scan video.

Video shot with a standard video camera format such as S-VHS or Mini-DV is often interlaced when created, whereas video shot with a film-based camera is almost always progressive. Free-to-air analog TV was mostly broadcast as interlaced material because the trade-off of spatial resolution for frame-rate reduced flickering on Cathode ray tube (CRT) televisions. High-definition digital television (see: HDTV) today can be broadcast terrestrially or distributed through cable system in either interlaced (1080i) or progressive scan formats (720p or 1080p). Most prosumer camcorders can record in progressive scan formats.

In video editing, it is crucial to know which of the two (odd or even) fields is "dominant."  Selecting edit points on the wrong field can result in a "flash" at each edit point and playing the video fields in reverse order creates a flickering image.

See also 
 Federal Standard 1037C: defines field in interlaced video.
 Color framing

External links 
All About Video Fields: technical information with emphasis on the programming implications of fields

Television technology